Raymond Karl is a Papua New Guinean rugby league footballer who represented Papua New Guinea national rugby league team in the 2000 World Cup.

Playing career
A Sydney Roosters lower grader, Kahl captained the Enga Mioks to the SP Cup title in 2000.

He played in eleven test matches for Papua New Guinea between 1996 and 2001.

References

Living people
Papua New Guinean rugby league players
Papua New Guinea national rugby league team players
1974 births
Enga Mioks players
Rugby league props
Rugby league second-rows